Angelico or Angélico may refer to:

People
 Fra Angelico (1395–1455), early Italian renaissance painter
 Angelico Carta (1886–?), Italian military officer
 Angelico Chavez (1910–1996), American Franciscan priest, historian, author, poet, and painter
 Angélico Vieira (1982–2011), Portuguese actor and singer
 Angélico (born 1987), South African professional wrestler
 Maria Angelico ( 2001–2018), Australian actor, writer and producer

Other uses
 Muscadelle, a French wine grape alternatively called angelico)
 Pallacanestro Biella, an Italian professional basketball club known as Angelico Biella in domestic competition

See also
 Angelica (disambiguation)